Grega Benedik (born May 11, 1962) is a former Slovenian alpine skier who represented Yugoslavia at the Olympics in 1984 in Sarajevo and 1988 in Calgary.

World Cup Results

Season standings

Race podiums

References

External links 
 
 
 

1962 births
Living people
Slovenian male alpine skiers
Olympic alpine skiers of Yugoslavia
Alpine skiers at the 1984 Winter Olympics
Alpine skiers at the 1988 Winter Olympics
People from Žirovnica, Žirovnica
Universiade medalists in alpine skiing
Universiade bronze medalists for Yugoslavia
Competitors at the 1987 Winter Universiade